Nouragues Nature Reserve is a French nature reserve in French Guiana created in 1995. It protects  of tropical rainforest in the communes of  Régina and Roura.

Overview

Nouragues Nature Reserve is the second largest nature reserve of France. The name is of Amerindian origin. The reserve is mainly covered by rainforests and is hilly.

The nature reserve is not accessible to the public except with authorisation.

Nouragues Station
CNRS operates two permanent camps on the Nouragues Inselberg. The camp is home to about 40 expeditions a year and is on a good location to study the rainforest and its biodiversity. The camps can be accessed by helicopter or by boat from Saut Pararé.

References

External links
Official site (in French)

Environment of French Guiana
Nature reserves in France
Protected areas established in 1996
Protected areas of French Guiana
Régina
Roura